Olá   is a corregimiento in Olá District, Coclé Province, Panama with a population of 1,419 as of 2010. It is the seat of Olá District. Its population as of 1990 was 1,255; its population as of 2000 was 1,326.

References

Corregimientos of Coclé Province